Eziama Obiato is a town in Mbaitoli Local Government Area of Imo State, southeastern Nigeria. It is about 18 kilometers to the city of Owerri. The town is strategically located as it shares common boundaries with four other Local Government Areas in Imo State. It is bordered by Awo-Omamma (Oru East), Umu-ofor/Akabo (Oguta LGA), Amazano/Umuaka (Njaba LGA), Afara and Umunoha (both in Mbaitoli LGA). Eziama Obiato is home to the popular "Ukwuorji" Bus Stop on the Owerri/Onitsha Road. 

The town is home to the mysterious palm tree with three stems/branches. Many indigenes of the town share the belief that the Palm Tree is a symbol of unity and progress, and thus each branch represents the three villages  (Obi-ato) of the town.  The villages are in this order of seniority: Ezioha (formerly known as Otura) comprising Ezioha-Ukwu, Ezioha-Amaibo, Umuele and Ogwa. Umuagha consists of Umudim-Emeroha, Obo'kika and Umu-ekpu. Nkwokwu is made of Umuduruafor, Umufere and Obabor.

Towns in Imo State